M'Backé N'Diaye (born on 19 December 1994), is a Mauritanian professional footballer who plays as a goalkeeper for Nouakchott Kings and the Mauritanian national team.

Club career
N'Diaye plays for Super D1 club Nouakchott Kings.

International career
He debuted internationally on 3 June 2021 in a friendly match against Angola in a 4–1 loss.

He last recently appeared at the 2022 FIFA World Cup qualifying match against Equatorial Guinea in a 1–1 draw on 16 November.

On 19 November 2021, N'Diaye was included in a final-23 squad to participate at the 2021 FIFA Arab Cup in Qatar.

On 3 December, he played a full match against the United Arab Emirates in a 1–0 defeat.

References

1994 births
Living people
Mauritanian footballers
Mauritania international footballers
Association football goalkeepers
2021 Africa Cup of Nations players
People from Rosso
Nouakchott Kings players
Mauritania A' international footballers
2022 African Nations Championship players